Margaret Thatcher received numerous honours in recognition of her career in politics. These included a peerage, membership of the Order of the Garter, the Order of Saint John and the Order of Merit, along with numerous other British and foreign honours. These included the Order of King Abdulaziz from Saudi Arabia in 1990. She was also honoured in Kuwait in 1991.

Life peerage
Margaret Thatcher was given a life peerage on her standing down from the House of Commons at the 1992 United Kingdom general election. This allowed her a seat in the House of Lords. She took the title Baroness Thatcher, of Kesteven in the County of Lincolnshire. She sat with the Conservative Party benches.

Coat of arms
As a member of the House of Lords with a life peerage, Thatcher was entitled to use a personal coat of arms. A second coat of arms was created following her appointment as Lady Companion of the Order of the Garter (LG) in 1995. Despite receiving her own arms, Thatcher sometimes used the Royal Arms instead of her own, contrary to protocol.

Commonwealth honours

Foreign honours

Other distinctions

Scholastic

Memberships and fellowships

Freedom of the City

  6 February 1980: Barnet
  10 January 1983: Falkland Islands
  26 May 1989: London  
  12 December 1990: Westminster
  16 September 1998: Zagreb
  11 November 2000: Gdańsk

Awards

Places and other things named after Thatcher

Places
  (Gyumri): Margaret Thatcher Street.
  (Waroona): Thatcher Street.
  (Stanley), Thatcher Drive.
 : Thatcher Peninsula.
 :
Madrid: Margaret Thatcher Public School.
Madrid: Plaza Margaret Thatcher.
 :
Grantham: Roberts Hall in Kesteven and Grantham Girls' School.
Kidderminster: Margaret Thatcher House (Regional Conservative Party Headquarters).
Somerville College, Oxford: Margaret Thatcher Centre.
Chelsea: Margaret Thatcher Infirmary.
Chelsea: Maggie's Club.
West Drayton: Thatcher Close.
  (Washington, D.C.): Margaret Thatcher Center for Freedom at The Heritage Foundation.

Other things
: Margaret Thatcher Day.
: Thatcherism.
The orchid Dendrobium Margaret Thatcher.

References

Margaret Thatcher
Thatcher, Margaret
Thatcher, Margaret